Gerardo Masini (born December 31, 1982 in Cipolletti) is an Argentine professional football player. Currently, he plays in Serie D for Avezzano Calcio. He also holds Italian citizenship.

Career

Club career
He played on professional level in Lega Pro Prima Divisione for Salernitana Calcio 1919 and Potenza S.C. and in Lega Pro Seconda Divisione for Cassino, Ischia Isolaverde and Martina.

In September 2010, he was signed by Serie D club Luco Canistro. Subsequently he played with Teramo Calcio, Ischia Isolaverde, Martina, Rimini, Virtus Francavilla, Poggibonsi, F.C. Francavilla, Latina and Avezzano.

References

External links

Gerardo Masini at BD Futbol

1982 births
Living people
Argentine people of Italian descent
Argentine footballers
Argentine expatriate footballers
U.S. Salernitana 1919 players
A.S.D. Cassino Calcio 1924 players
UD Alzira footballers
Zamora CF footballers
Club Atlético Independiente footballers
Club Cipolletti footballers
Potenza S.C. players
S.S. Ischia Isolaverde players
S.S. Teramo Calcio players
A.S. Martina Franca 1947 players
Rimini F.C. 1912 players
Virtus Francavilla Calcio players
U.S. Poggibonsi players
F.C. Francavilla players
Latina Calcio 1932 players
Avezzano Calcio players
Serie D players
Association football forwards
Expatriate footballers in Italy
Expatriate footballers in Spain
Argentine expatriate sportspeople in Italy
Argentine expatriate sportspeople in Spain
People from Cipolletti